The 1st district of the Alabama Senate is currently represented by Tim Melson, a Republican.

Communities
The district includes portions of Lauderdale, Limestone, and Madison counties. Communities contained at least partially within the district include the following:

Cities
Athens
Florence
Huntsville

Towns
Anderson
Ardmore
Elkmont
Killen
Lester
Lexington
Rogersville
St. Florian

Unincorporated places
Meridianville
Underwood-Petersville

References

01